Pterophorus flavus is a moth of the family Pterophoridae. It is found in Nepal and northern India (Kumaon).

The wingspan is 17–25 mm. The forewings are yellow. Adults have been recorded in June, July and September.

References

Moths described in 1991
flavus
Moths of Asia